White Paradise is an 2022 French drama thriller film written and directed by Guillaume Renusson in his feature film directorial debut, and starring Denis Ménochet, Zar Amir Ebrahimi and Victoire Du Bois. The film made its world premiere in official competition at the Angoulême Film Festival on 24 August 2022. Ad Vitam Distribution released the film theatrically in France on 4 January 2023.

Plot
Samuel is a widower who lives isolated in his chalet in the heart of the Italian Alps. One night, Chehreh, a young Afghan woman takes refuge in his home, trapped by the snow. She wants to cross the mountain to reach France. Samuel does not want trouble but faced with his distress, he decides to help her. Beyond the hostility of nature, they will also have to face the hostility of the locals who are determined to stop Chehreh from crossing the border.

Cast
 Denis Ménochet as Samuel
 Zar Amir Ebrahimi as Chehreh
 Victoire Du Bois as Justine
 Oscar Copp as Victor
 Luca Terracciano as Stefano
 Guillaume Pottier as Cédric
 Roxane Barazzuol as Léa
 Julie Moulier as Driver
 Loïc Corbery as Gendarme du second contrôle
 Julie-Anne Roth as Infirmière bénévole
 Bastien Ughetto as Grégoire

Production

Filming
Filming took place in the Hautes-Alpes and in the Alpes-de-Haute-Provence in France. Principal photography started in March 2020, but it had to be interrupted on 16 March 2020 due to the COVID-19 pandemic. Filming resumed on 11 January 2021 and wrapped on 12 February 2021.

Release
The film made its world premiere in official competition at the Angoulême Film Festival on 24 August 2022. Ad Vitam Distribution released the film theatrically in France on 4 January 2023.

Reception

Critical response
AlloCiné, a French cinema website, gave the film an average rating of 3.6/5, based on a survey of 20 French reviews.

Box office
In France, White Paradise was released to 120 theaters, where it debuted at number fifteenth at the box office, selling 38,064 tickets.

Awards and nominations

References

External links
 

2022 films
2022 directorial debut films
French drama films
French thriller films
2020s French-language films
2020s Italian-language films
2020s French films
Films set in France
Films shot in France
Films about refugees
Films about immigration to France
Film productions suspended due to the COVID-19 pandemic
Films impacted by the COVID-19 pandemic
Films scored by Robin Coudert